Events in the year 1721 in Japan.

Incumbents
Monarch: Nakamikado

Events
January 3 - The Love Suicides at Amijima (Shinjūten no Amijima) is performed for the first time at the Takemoto Theater. (Traditional Japanese Date: Sixth Day of the Twelfth Month, 1720)

References

 
1720s in Japan
Japan
Years of the 18th century in Japan